Huron West was a federal electoral district represented in the House of Commons of Canada from 1882 to 1917. It was located in the province of Ontario. This riding was created from parts of Huron Centre, Huron North and Huron South ridings.

The West Riding of the county of Huron was initially defined to consist of the 
townships of East Wawanosh, West Wawanosh, Ashfield, Colborne and Goderich, and the towns of Goderich and Clinton.

In 1903, it was redefined to include the township of Hullett, and exclude the township of East Wawanosh.

The electoral district was abolished in 1914 when it was redistributed between Huron North and Huron South ridings.

Election results

|}

|}

|}

On Mr. Cameron being unseated, 26 December 1891:
 

|}

On Mr. Patterson being named Lieutenant-Governor of Manitoba, 2 September 1895:

|}

|}

On Mr. Cameron's appointment as Lieutenant-Governor of the North West Territories, May 30, 1898:

|}

|}

|}

|}

|}

See also 

 List of Canadian federal electoral districts
 Past Canadian electoral districts

External links 
Riding history from the Library of Parliament

Former federal electoral districts of Ontario